JoyNEE was a provider of digital television via satellite for the Dutch and Flemish market, using the Eutelsat's 9B satellites at 9°E east. JoyNEE is a combination of the words Joy and NEE (NEE means NO in English) For most channels a smartcard was required to decrypt the Conax signal.
On 9 April 2021 JoyNEE went bankrupt. Bankruptcy was requested by Eutelsat. On 19 April 2021 it was announced Canal+ Luxembourg took over certain assets. Customers were offered to move to Canal Digitaal and TV Vlaanderen's offer. Some channels offered formerly by JoyNEE continued broadcasting on Eutelsat 9B until 31 July 2021. Some other channels including channels owned by Discovery have ceased broadcast on 19 April 2021.

See also
 Television in the Netherlands
 Digital television in the Netherlands

References

External links
JoyNEE Netherlands
JoyNEE Flanders
List of channels on Joynee

Direct broadcast satellite services